Knight Bachelor is the oldest and lowest-ranking form of knighthood in the British honours system; it is the rank granted to a man who has been knighted by the monarch but not inducted as a member of one of the organised orders of chivalry. Women are not knighted; in practice, the equivalent award for a woman is appointment as Dame Commander of the Order of the British Empire (founded in 1917).

Knights Bachelor appointed in 1919

Knights who died before they could receive the accolade 
It was announced in the 1919 Birthday Honours that a knighthood was to be bestowed on William Allan Ironside (an additional Member of the Indian Legislative Council), but he died before he received the accolade. By a royal warrant gazetted on 22 July 1919, George V declared that his widow, Ellen Ironside, "shall have, hold and enjoy the same style; title, place and precedence to which she would have been entitled had her said husband survived and received either personally or by Letters-Patent under the Great Seal the degree, style and title of a Knight Bachelor".

The London Gazette also reported that the King intended to bestow a knighthood on Ernest Adolphus O'Bryen, formerly the mayor of Hampstead, but he died before he received the accolade. By a royal warrant gazetted with the date 30 May 1919, George V declared that his widow, Gertrude Mary O'Bryen, should also be afforded the style of a knight's widow.

References 

Knights Bachelor
Lists of knights and dames
British honours system